Superior laryngeal may refer to:
 Superior laryngeal artery, a branch of the superior laryngeal artery
 Superior laryngeal nerve